Top Country Albums is a chart that ranks the top-performing country music albums in the United States, published by Billboard.  In 1998, nine different albums topped the chart, based on electronic point of sale data provided by SoundScan Inc.

In the issue of Billboard dated January 3, Garth Brooks was at number one with Sevens, the album's fourth week in the top spot.  Sevens held the peak position for the first five weeks of the year and returned to number one for five further weeks.  Later in the year Brooks achieved two further number ones.  In May he topped the chart with The Limited Series, a box set consisting of re-issues of six of his previous albums, five of which had reached number one in their own right.  In December he returned to the top spot with the live recording Double Live, which was at number one for the final four weeks of the year.  Having been certified more than 20 times platinum by the Recording Industry Association of America, Double Live is the biggest-selling live album of all time in the United States; it was the singer's ninth chart-topping album of the 1990s, a decade in which he experienced a level of mainstream popularity and success unprecedented for a country artist.

Brooks's total of 18 weeks at number one with his three chart-toppers was exceeded by a single week by Canadian singer Shania Twain, who spent 19 non-consecutive weeks atop the chart with her album Come On Over, which had first reached number one late the previous year.  The album would eventually spend a total of 50 weeks at number one, making it the longest-running chart-topper in the history of the Top Country Albums listing.  In 2000, it was recognized by the Recording Industry Association of America as the highest-selling album of all time by a female artist, as well as the biggest-selling country album.  In August, Vince Gill, who had first entered the Top Country Albums chart in 1984, gained his first number one with The Key, which spent a single week in the top spot.  He is one of four acts to top the chart in 1998 who are members of the Country Music Hall of Fame, along with Brooks, George Strait and Alan Jackson.

Chart history

References

1998
1998 record charts